Naserabad (also Romanized as Nāşerābād and Naşrābād) is a village in Sirch Rural District, Shahdad District, Kerman County, Kerman Province, Iran. At the 2006 census, its population was 22, in 7 families.

References 

Populated places in Kerman County